Janne Oinas (born 27 November 1973) is a Finnish former footballer. He played the position of defender and was a member of the Finland national football team.

External links
 

1973 births
Living people
Veikkausliiga players
Allsvenskan players
Turun Palloseura footballers
FC Flora players
Örebro SK players
Expatriate footballers in Estonia
Finnish footballers
Finnish expatriate footballers
Finland international footballers
Footballers from Turku
Association football defenders
Meistriliiga players
Finnish expatriate sportspeople in Estonia